John Robert (Bob) Spence (born February 10, 1946) is a former Major League Baseball player. He batted left and threw right-handed.

He was drafted by the White Sox in the 1st round (4th overall pick) of the 1967 amateur draft.

He attended St. Augustine High School in San Diego, California and graduated in 1964. Following his retirement from baseball, he returned to St. Augustine as a teacher.

References

External links

1946 births
Baseball players from San Diego
Chicago White Sox players
Lynchburg White Sox players
Eugene Emeralds players
Appleton Foxes players
Tucson Toros players
Living people